AEW Holiday Bash is an annual professional wrestling television special produced by the American promotion All Elite Wrestling (AEW). Established in 2020, the event airs in December as AEW's Christmas television special. The first event aired as a special episode of the promotion's flagship weekly television program, Dynamite, while the second event was expanded to two nights, the first airing again as a special episode of Dynamite with the second part airing as a special episode of Rampage with future events retaining this two-part format.

History
On December 9, 2020, All Elite Wrestling (AEW) announced that the December 23 episode of their flagship television program, Dynamite, would be a special episode titled Holiday Bash. The Christmas television special was taped on December 17 at Daily's Place in Jacksonville, Florida due to the ongoing COVID-19 pandemic.

AEW resumed live touring in July 2021. On December 7 that year, AEW President Tony Khan confirmed that Holiday Bash would return, expanding to a two-part event. The first part aired live on December 22 for Dynamite while the second part aired on tape delay on Christmas Day as a special episode of Rampage—AEW's secondary television program that began airing in August 2021. The event took place at the Greensboro Coliseum in Greensboro, North Carolina. While Rampage usually airs on Fridays, for the Holiday Bash special, it was pushed back to Saturday night because of TNT's traditional  Christmas Eve marathon showing of A Christmas Story.

The 2022 event retained the two-part format, but this time with Rampage airing in its normal Friday night time slot as there was not a broadcasting conflict like the previous year.

Events

See also
List of All Elite Wrestling special events
List of All Elite Wrestling pay-per-view events

References

External links

Recurring events established in 2020
 
All Elite Wrestling shows